The Temporary Widow is a 1930 British-German comedy film, an English-language parallel version directed by Gustav Ucicky and starring Anglo-German actress and singer Lilian Harvey, Laurence Olivier in his first film role, and Athole Stewart.

After unsuccessful painter Paul Kellermann has disappeared, interest in his paintings rises, until his soft-spoken widow Kitty Kellermann is accused to have murdered her husband by drowning him in a lake. A mysterious person warns the court president Grandt that somebody wants to kill him, and he sends a telegram to his friend and lawyer to come for support. The night before the court session that likely will sentence her, a surprise visitor shows up at night and seemingly provides ample evidence that his friend and lawyer, knowing about the terms in the testament, has the intention to take advantage of that, having bought a ticket well before he received the telegram. After making his point that things are not always as they may seem, as simple sleight of hand "hocus-pocus" tricks and a forged date on a ticket apparently had convinced the judge within minutes that his long-term friend has evil intentions, the visitor declares that he is Peter Bille, a former circus artist, illusionist, speed painter, trick shooter, escape artist, and jurist, and that he will defend poor and innocent Mrs. Kellermann because her lawyer has stepped down.

The film sets were designed by the art directors Robert Herlth and Walter Röhrig. Both films versions were shot at the Babelsberg Studios.

The films were based on the play Hokuspokus written in 1926 by Curt Goetz, but use different role names, e.g. Kitty Kellermann instead of the original Danish-sounding Agda Kjerulf. The German language version Hokuspokus was made at the same time starring  Willy Fritsch, the English-language version was given a differing title though, referring to one of the paintings. After the war, director Kurt Hoffmann filmed two further versions in 1953 (starring Curt Goetz himself alongside his wife), and in 1966 in color.

Cast
 Lilian Harvey as Kitty Kellermann
 Laurence Olivier as Peter Bille
 Athole Stewart as President of the Court of Justice
 Gillian Dean as Witness Anny Sedal
 Frank Stanmore as Witness Kulicke
 Felix Aylmer as Public Prosecutor
 Frederick Lloyd as Counsel for the Defense
 Henry Caine as Councillor Lindberg

References

External links

1930 films
1930 comedy films
British comedy films
Films of the Weimar Republic
Films directed by Gustav Ucicky
Films based on works by Curt Goetz
British films based on plays
German films based on plays
British multilingual films
British courtroom films
German multilingual films
Films about fictional painters
Films produced by Erich Pommer
UFA GmbH films
German comedy films
German black-and-white films
British black-and-white films
1930 multilingual films
1930s English-language films
1930s British films
1930s German films